In enzymology, a mannitol 2-dehydrogenase is an enzyme that catalyzes the chemical reaction

D-mannitol + NAD+  D-fructose + NADH + H+

Thus, the two substrates of this enzyme are D-mannitol and NAD+, whereas its 3 products are D-fructose, NADH, and H+.

This enzyme belongs to the family of oxidoreductases, specifically those acting on the CH-OH group of donor with NAD+ or NADP+ as acceptor. The systematic name of this enzyme class is D-mannitol:NAD+ 2-oxidoreductase. Other names in common use include D-mannitol dehydrogenase, and mannitol dehydrogenase. This enzyme participates in fructose and mannose metabolism.

Structural studies

References

 

EC 1.1.1
NADH-dependent enzymes
Enzymes of known structure